Gao Rui (born 20 May 1992 in Qingdao) is a chess player from China. He was awarded the FIDE titles of International Master in 2009 and Grandmaster in 2013.

He won the First Saturday IM tournaments of May and June 2008 in Budapest. In 2015, Gao won the Best Newcomer Award, jointly with Koswate. K.R.C.T. from Sri Lanka, at the 1st Asian University Chess Championship in Beijing.

References

External links
Gao Rui chess games at 365Chess.com

1992 births
Living people
Chess grandmasters
Sportspeople from Qingdao
Chess players from Shandong
21st-century Chinese people